Kiki Fatmala (born 26 October 1969) is an Indonesian actress. She became popular since starring as Mariam in the Indosiar soap opera Mariam, Si Manis Jembatan Ancol, on 1996.

Filmography

Film

Television

Film Television

References

1969 births
Actresses from Jakarta
Living people
Indonesian people of Pakistani descent